Blomvåg is a village in Øygarden municipality in Vestland county, Norway.  The village is located in the central part of the island of Blomøyna, surrounding inner part of the Blomvågen fjord.  The Blomvåg Church was built in this village in 1931, serving part of the municipality of Øygarden.  About 250 people live in Blomvåg (as of 2002).  The economy is based on the fishing industry, and historically it was also a whaling port.

References

Villages in Vestland
Øygarden